Donis "D. L." Wilson (born January 1, 1965) is an American professional stock car racing driver. He competes part-time in the ARCA Menards Series, driving the Nos. 01/12 for Fast Track Racing.

Racing career

ARCA Menards Series 
Wilson would get his start in the series in 2017 with Fast Track Racing for a test session, after a deal with another team failed to materialize.

Wilson would get his debut in 2018 at Nashville Fairgrounds Speedway, retiring and finishing 25th due to ignition problems. Since then, he has made at least one start in every season since then, with him greatly expanding his schedule in 2021, racing 14 of the 20 races that year. Wilson would get his first top 10 at the 2021 Allen Crowe 100, finishing 10th.

Political career 
Wilson would try and run as a Republican for McLennan County Commissioner, second precinct in 2018. Wilson would try and push for a better mental health system and drug system to stop drugs, along with a campaign for better roads in the local area. In the Republican primary, he would win, receiving 1,116 votes, or 64.36% of the votes cast. He would face off against Democrat Patricia Chisolm-Miller. Wilson would lose the election, only earning 4,573 votes, or 43% of the ballots compared to Chisolm-Miller's 6,016 votes, or 57% of the ballots. Wilson would blame Democrat straight-ticket voting for the reason of his loss.

Electoral history

2018

Personal life 
For 21 years, Wilson would work for the Texas Department of Public Safety.

Motorsports career results

ARCA Menards Series 
(key) (Bold – Pole position awarded by qualifying time. Italics – Pole position earned by points standings or practice time. * – Most laps led.)

ARCA Menards Series East

ARCA Menards Series West

References

External links 

 D. L. Wilson driver statistics at Racing-Reference

1965 births
Living people
ARCA Menards Series drivers
NASCAR drivers
Racing drivers from Texas